Rebecca Edwards (born 13 December 1993) is a Northern Irish and British rower.

Rowing career
She has been selected for the British team to compete in the rowing events, in the eight for the 2020 Summer Olympics.

References

1993 births
Living people
British female rowers
Rowers from Northern Ireland
Rowers at the 2020 Summer Olympics